Heavenly Mountain Resort is a ski resort located on the California–Nevada border in South Lake Tahoe in the Sierra Nevada Mountain Range. It opened for business on December 15, 1955 and has 97 runs and 30 lifts that are spread between California and Nevada and four base facilities.

Since 2002, Heavenly has been owned by Vail Resorts, which also operates Northstar California and Kirkwood Mountain Resort at Lake Tahoe and multiple other ski resorts in Colorado, British Columbia, Vermont, New Hampshire, Washington, Utah, Minnesota, Michigan, and Wisconsin (Vail, Breckenridge, Okemo, Mount Sunapee, Crested Butte, Stevens Pass, Keystone, Beaver Creek, Park City Resort (Canyons), Afton Alps, Mt. Brighton, and Wilmot Mountain, Whistler Blackcomb).

Heavenly is notable as the resort where Congressman and singer Sonny Bono died after hitting a tree on January 5, 1998.

Ski Lifts

The lifts built by Doppelmayr are the Big Easy, Canyon Express, Comet Express, Dipper Express, Galaxy, Gondola, Gunbarrel Express, Mott Canyon, Powderbowl Express, Sky Express, Stagecoach Express, and Tamarack Express. The lifts built by Yan are Boulder, First Ride, Groove, Patsy's, and The Ridge. SLI built Olympic, and World Cup. The oldest lift is World Cup, having been built in 1969. Mott Canyon also closes at 3:00 during the day thus its trails are closed too. Mostly high-speed detachable quads serve the resort. The longest lift is the Gondola by a significant amount. Two six-packs serve skiers; the Tamarack and Powderbowl Express chairs. Most of the lifts close at 4:00 PM with the exception of the Mott Canyon lift, which closes at 3:00, the Yan and SLI double lifts have a very similar appearance in chairs to lines, to terminals, only the bull wheels are different.

References

External links
 
 

1955 establishments in California
1955 establishments in Nevada
Buildings and structures in Douglas County, Nevada
Buildings and structures in El Dorado County, California
Landmarks in California
Landmarks in Nevada
Ski areas and resorts in California
Ski areas and resorts in Nevada
Tourist attractions in Douglas County, Nevada
Tourist attractions in El Dorado County, California
Vail Resorts